Jefferson Township is the name of two townships in the U.S. state of North Carolina:

 Jefferson Township, Ashe County, North Carolina
 Jefferson Township, Guilford County, North Carolina

See also 
 Jefferson Township (disambiguation)

North Carolina township disambiguation pages